The following highways are numbered 150:

Canada
 New Brunswick Route 150
 Prince Edward Island Route 150
 Winnipeg Route 150

Costa Rica
 National Route 150

India
 National Highway 150 (India)

Japan
 Japan National Route 150

United States
 U.S. Route 150
 Alabama State Route 150
 Arkansas Highway 150
 California State Route 150
 Colorado State Highway 150
 Connecticut Route 150
 Florida State Road 150 (former)
 Georgia State Route 150
 Illinois Route 150
 Iowa Highway 150
 K-150
 Louisiana Highway 150
 Maine State Route 150
 Maryland Route 150
 Massachusetts Route 150
 M-150 (Michigan highway)
 Missouri Route 150
 New Hampshire Route 150
 New Mexico State Road 150
 New York State Route 150
 North Carolina Highway 150
 Ohio State Route 150
 Oklahoma State Highway 150
 Pennsylvania Route 150
 South Carolina Highway 150
 Texas State Highway 150
 Texas State Highway Loop 150
 Utah State Route 150
 Virginia State Route 150
 Wisconsin Highway 150 (former)
 Wyoming Highway 150
Territories
 Puerto Rico Highway 150